Tigertown may refer to:

Arts, entertainment, and media

Fictional places
 Tiger Town, a fictional city in the Ming Dynasty-era Chinese novel, Fengshen Yanyi (Investiture of the Gods)

Music
 Tigertown Pictures, the 1999 third album by British indie pop band Comet Gain

Film and television
 Tiger Town, a 1983 American made-for-television sports drama film produced for the Disney Channel

Places and locations

United States 
 South Holyoke, Holyoke, Massachusetts, neighborhood, in the mid-nineteenth century referred to as Tigertown
 Tigertown, Texas, unincorporated community

See also 
 Tigerton, Wisconsin
 Tigerton (microprocessor)